The 1977 New South Wales Open, also known by its sponsored name Marlboro New South Wales Open, was a combined men's and women's tennis tournament played on outdoor grass courts at the White City Stadium in Sydney, Australia. The men's was part of the 1977 Colgate-Palmolive Grand Prix circuit. It was the 85th edition of the event and was held from 12 December through 18 January 1977. The singles titles were won by Evonne Goolagong Cawley and Roscoe Tanner. Defending champion Tony Roche was unable to participate due to a stomach muscle injury.

Finals

Men's singles
 Roscoe Tanner defeated  Brian Teacher 6–3, 3–6, 6–3, 6–7, 6–4

Women's singles
 Evonne Goolagong Cawley defeated  Sue Barker 6–2, 6–3

Men's doubles
 John Alexander /  Phil Dent defeated  Ray Ruffels /  Allan Stone 7–6, 2–6, 6–3

Women's doubles
 Evonne Goolagong Cawley /  Helen Gourlay Cawley defeated  Mona Guerrant /  Kerry Reid 6–0, 6–0

References

External links
 Official website
 Association of Tennis Professionals (ATP) tournament profile
 International Tennis Federation (ITF) men's tournament details
 Women's Tennis Association (WTA) tournament profile

Sydney International
Marlboro NSW Open
Marlboro NSW Open
Marlboro NSW Open
Marlboro NSW Open
Marlboro NSW Open, 1977